Muscle Shoals is a city in Alabama.

Muscle Shoals also may refer to:

 Muscle Shoals (film), a 2013 documentary about the studio
 Muscle Shoals Sound Studio, an American recording studio in Sheffield, Alabama
 Muscle Shoals Rhythm Section, a group of American session musicians based in Muscle Shoals, Alabama
 Leo "Muscle" Shoals (1916–1999), baseball player

See also
 Mussel Shoals (disambiguation)